Tetranchyroderma is a genus of gastrotrichs belonging to the family Thaumastodermatidae.

The genus has cosmopolitan distribution.

Species

Species:

Tetranchyroderma aapton 
Tetranchyroderma adeleae 
Tetranchyroderma aethesbregmum

References

Gastrotricha